Cyd Charisse (born Tula Ellice Finklea; March 8, 1922 - June 17, 2008) was an American actress and dancer.

After recovering from polio as a child and studying ballet, Charisse entered films in the 1940s. Her roles usually featured her abilities as a dancer, and she was paired with Fred Astaire and Gene Kelly; her films include Singin' in the Rain (1952), The Band Wagon (1953), Brigadoon with Gene Kelly and Van Johnson (1954) and Silk Stockings (1957). She stopped dancing in films in the late 1950s, but continued acting in film and television, and in 1991 made her Broadway debut. In her later years, she discussed the history of the Hollywood musical in documentaries, and was featured in That's Entertainment! III in 1994. She was awarded the National Medal of the Arts and Humanities in 2006.

Early life
Cyd Charisse was born Tula Ellice Finklea in Amarillo, Texas, the daughter of Lela (née Norwood) and Ernest Enos Finklea Sr., who was a jeweler. Her nickname "Sid" was taken from her older brother Ernest E. Finklea Jr., who tried to say "Sis". It was later given the spelling of "Cyd" by Arthur Freed.

She was a sickly girl who started dancing lessons at six to build up her strength after a bout of polio. At 12, she studied ballet in Los Angeles with Adolph Bolm and Bronislava Nijinska, and at 14, she auditioned for and subsequently danced in the Ballet Russe de Monte-Carlo as "Felia Siderova" and, later, "Maria Istomina". She was educated at the Hollywood Professional School.

During a European tour, she met up again with Nico Charisse, a young dancer she had studied with for a time in Los Angeles. They married in Paris in 1939 and had a son, Nicky.

Career

Early films
Charisse appeared uncredited in some films like Escort Girl (1941) and was in a short for Warner Bros, The Gay Parisian (1942).

The outbreak of World War II led to the breakup of the ballet company, and when Charisse returned to Los Angeles, David Lichine offered her a dancing role in Gregory Ratoff's Something to Shout About (1943) at Columbia. This brought her to the attention of choreographer Robert Alton—who had also discovered Gene Kelly—and soon she joined the Freed Unit at Metro-Goldwyn-Mayer, where she became the resident MGM ballet dancer.

Early MGM roles
Charisse made some uncredited appearances in Mission to Moscow (1943) (as a ballet dancer) and Thousands Cheer (1943). She was borrowed by Warners for In Our Time (1944), playing a ballerina.

She was a ballerina in Ziegfeld Follies (produced in 1944 and released in 1946), dancing with Fred Astaire. Feedback was positive and Charisse was given her first speaking part supporting Judy Garland in the 1946 film The Harvey Girls.

She followed it with Three Wise Fools (1946) and she danced with Gower Champion to "Smoke Gets in Your Eyes" in Till the Clouds Roll By (1946). She also had a supporting role in the Esther Williams musical Fiesta (1947).

Rising fame

Charisse was second billed in The Unfinished Dance (1947) with Margaret O'Brien but the film was a box office flop. She had a good supporting part in On an Island with You (1948) with Williams and danced in The Kissing Bandit (1948). She had a supporting part in Words and Music (1948).

Charisse was given another opportunity in a "B" movie, Tension (1950), where she was third billed, but it was a box office disappointment. She was billed fifth in the prestigious East Side, West Side (1949) and was borrowed by Universal to play the female lead in The Mark of the Renegade (1951).

Back at MGM Charisse was the leading lady in The Wild North (1951) with Stewart Granger, which was a huge hit. Because Debbie Reynolds was not a trained dancer, Kelly chose Charisse to partner with him in the celebrated "Broadway Melody" ballet finale from Singin' in the Rain (1952), which was acknowledged soon after release as one of the greatest musicals of all time.

Stardom
Charisse had a significant role in Sombrero (1953) as well as the lead female role in The Band Wagon (1953), where she danced with Astaire in the acclaimed "Dancing in the Dark" and "Girl Hunt Ballet" routines. Vincente Minnelli directed. Critic Pauline Kael said that "when the bespangled Charisse wraps her phenomenal legs around Astaire, she can be forgiven everything, even her three minutes of 'classical' ballet and the fact that she reads her lines as if she learned them phonetically." The film was another classic but lost money for MGM.

Charisse had a cameo in Easy to Love (1953) then co-starred with Kelly in the Scottish-themed musical film Brigadoon (1954), directed by Minnelli. It was a box office disappointment. She again took the lead female role (alongside Kelly) in his MGM musical It's Always Fair Weather (1955), which lost money. In between she made an appearance in Deep in My Heart (1954).

Charisse co-starred with Dan Dailey in Meet Me in Las Vegas (1956), which also lost money. She rejoined Astaire in the film version of Silk Stockings (1957), a musical remake of 1939's Ninotchka, with Charisse taking over Greta Garbo's role. Astaire paid tribute to Charisse in his autobiography, calling her "beautiful dynamite" and writing: "That Cyd! When you've danced with her you stay danced with." The film was well received but lost money for MGM.

In her autobiography, Charisse reflected on her experience with Astaire and Kelly:

As one of the handful of girls who worked with both of those dance geniuses, I think I can give an honest comparison. In my opinion, Kelly is the more inventive choreographer of the two. Astaire, with Hermes Pan's help, creates fabulous numbers—for himself and his partner. But Kelly can create an entire number for somebody else ... I think, however, that Astaire's coordination is better than Kelly's ... his sense of rhythm is uncanny. Kelly, on the other hand, is the stronger of the two. When he lifts you, he lifts you! ... To sum it up, I'd say they were the two greatest dancing personalities who were ever on screen. But it's like comparing apples and oranges. They're both delicious.

Charisse had a slightly unusual serious acting role in Party Girl (1958), where she played a showgirl who became involved with gangsters and a crooked lawyer, although it did include two dance routines. It was far more profitable for MGM than her musicals.

She went to Universal to co-star with Rock Hudson in Twilight for the Gods (1958).

1960s
After the decline of the Hollywood musical in the late 1950s, Charisse retired from dancing but continued to appear in film and TV productions from the 1960s through the 1990s. She went to Europe to make Five Golden Hours (1961) and Minnelli's Two Weeks in Another Town.

She had a supporting role in Something's Got to Give (1962), the last, unfinished film of Marilyn Monroe. She did Assassination in Rome (1965) in Italy.

A striptease number by Charisse set to the movie's theme song opened the 1966 Dean Martin spy spoof, The Silencers, and she played a fashion magazine editor in the 1967 caper film Maroc 7.

She frequently performed dance numbers on TV variety series such as The Ed Sullivan Show and The Dean Martin Show, with seven appearances on The Hollywood Palace, a show she also hosted three times. She did Fol-de-Rol in 1968, which was filmed and broadcast in 1972.

1970s and 1980s
In the 1970s and 1980s Charisse guest-starred on shows such as Medical Center, Hawaii Five-O, The Love Boat, Fantasy Island, The Fall Guy, Glitter, Murder, She Wrote, and Crazy Like a Fox.

She had a cameo in Won Ton Ton, the Dog Who Saved Hollywood (1976) and played Atsil, an Atlantean high priestess, in the 1978 fantasy film Warlords of Atlantis.

Charisse was in the TV movies Portrait of an Escort (1980) and Swimsuit (1989).

She also made cameo appearances in Blue Mercedes's "I Want to Be Your Property" (1987) and Janet Jackson's "Alright" (1990) music videos.

Later career
Charisse appeared on Broadway from late 1991 as a replacement for Liliane Montevecchi in Grand Hotel. Her last film appearance was in 1994 in That's Entertainment! III as one of the onscreen narrators of a tribute to the great MGM musical films. She also appeared in episodes of Burke's Law and Frasier in 1995 before retiring from acting. Subsequently, she made a brief and posthumous comeback in the TV movie Empire State Building Murders, which aired some two months after her death in 2008.

Later years

In 1976, Charisse and her husband Tony Martin wrote their joint memoirs with Dick Kleiner entitled The Two of Us (1976). In 1990, following similar moves by MGM colleagues Debbie Reynolds and Angela Lansbury, Charisse produced the exercise video Easy Energy Shape Up, targeted for active senior citizens. She made her Broadway debut in 1989 in the musical version of Grand Hotel as the aging ballerina, Elizaveta Grushinskaya. In her eighties, Charisse made occasional public appearances and appeared frequently in documentaries spotlighting the golden age of Hollywood.

She was featured in the 2001 Guinness Book of World Records under "Most Valuable Legs", because a $5 million insurance policy was reportedly issued on her legs in 1952.

Personal life
Charisse's first husband, whose surname she kept, was Greek-born Nico Charisse; they were married in 1939 and had a son, Nico "Nicky" Charisse, before divorcing in 1947. In 1948, Charisse married singer Tony Martin, and remained married to him until her death in 2008. They had a son, Tony Martin Jr.

Her daughter-in-law is actress and model Liv Lindeland, who was married to Tony Martin Jr. until his death in 2011. Sheila Charisse, another daughter-in-law and the wife of Nicky Charisse, her son from her first marriage to Nico, died in the crash of American Airlines Flight 191 on May 25, 1979. Charisse, like her husband Tony Martin Sr., was a staunch Republican and campaigned for Barry Goldwater in the 1964 United States presidential election and Richard Nixon in 1968. She was the aunt of the actress Nana Visitor.

Charisse was admitted to Cedars-Sinai Medical Center in Los Angeles, California on June 16, 2008, after suffering an apparent heart attack. She died the following day at age 86. She was a practicing Methodist, but due to her husband's religion she was buried at Hillside Memorial Park Cemetery, a Jewish cemetery in Culver City, California, following a Methodist ceremony.

Honors

On November 9, 2006, in a private White House ceremony, President George W. Bush presented Cyd Charisse with the National Medal of the Arts and Humanities, the highest official U.S. honor available in the arts.

Filmography
Features:

 Escort Girl (1941) as Flamenco Dancer (uncredited)
 Something to Shout About (1943) as Lily
 Mission to Moscow (1943) as Galina Ulanova – Ballerina (uncredited)
 Thousands Cheer (1943) as Dancer in Don Loper Number (uncredited)
 In Our Time (1944) as Ballerina (uncredited)
 Ziegfeld Follies (1945) as Ballerina ('Beauty')
 The Harvey Girls (1946) as Deborah Andrews
 Three Wise Fools (1946) as Rena Fairchild
 Till the Clouds Roll By (1946) as Dance Specialty (segment 'Roberta')
 Fiesta (1947) as Conchita
 The Unfinished Dance (1947) as Mlle. Ariane Bouchet
 On an Island with You (1948) as Yvonne Torro
 The Kissing Bandit (1948) as Dancer
 Words and Music (1948) as Margo Grant
 East Side, West Side (1949) as Rosa Senta
 Tension (1950) as Mary Chanler
 The Mark of the Renegade (1951) as Manuella de Vasquez
 The Wild North (1952) as Indian Girl
 Singin' in the Rain (1952) as the long-legged woman in the green sequined dress and Louise Brooks hair who vamps Gene Kelly in the "Broadway Melody" sequence
 Sombrero (1953) as Lola de Torrano
 The Band Wagon (1953) as Gabrielle Gerard
 Easy to Love (1953, cameo) as Girl in Blue Swimsuit (uncredited)
 Brigadoon (1954) as Fiona Campbell
 Deep in My Heart (1954) as Performer in 'The Desert Song'
 It's Always Fair Weather (1955) as Jackie Leighton
 Meet Me in Las Vegas (1956) as Maria Corvier
 Silk Stockings (1957) as Ninotchka Yoschenko
 Twilight for the Gods (1958) as Charlotte King
 Party Girl (1958) as Vicki Gaye
 Black Tights (1960) as Baroness Sandra
 Five Golden Hours (1961) as The Wife
 Two Weeks in Another Town (1962) as Carlotta
 Something's Got To Give (1962, Short, unfinished) as Bianca Arden
 Assassination in Rome (1965) as Shelley North
 The Silencers (1966) as Sarita
 Maroc 7 (1967) as Louise Henderson
 Film Portrait (1972, documentary) as Herself
 Won Ton Ton, the Dog Who Saved Hollywood (1976) as President's Girl 4
 Warlords of Atlantis (1978) as Atsil
 Swimsuit (1984, made for television)
 Visioni private (1989) as Herself
 That's Entertainment! III (1994) as Herself
 Empire State Building Murders (2008) as Vicky Adams

Short subjects:
 Rhumba Serenade (1941)
 Poeme (1941)
 I Knew It Would Be This Way (1941)
 Did Anyone Call? (1941)
 Magic of Magnolias (1942)
 This Love of Mine (1942)
 1955 Motion Picture Theatre Celebration (1955) as Herself (uncredited)

Television:
 What's My Line? – Tribute episode to Fred Allen, air date March 18, 1956
 Medical Center – Season 6, Episode 16, "No Way Home" (1975) as Valerie
 Hawaii Five-O – Season 11, Episode 7, "Death Mask" (1978) as Alicia Warren
 Murder, She Wrote – Season 2, Episode 1, "Widow, Weep for Me" (1985) as Myrna Montclair LeRoy
 Frasier – Season 3, Episode 7, "The Adventures of Bad Boy and Dirty Girl" (1995) as Polly (voice)

Theater
 Les Poupées de Paris (1962) ( voice only)
 A Two Act Revue (1964)
 Illya Darling (1968)
 Can-Can (1969)
 Damn Yankees (1969)
 No, No, Nanette (1972)
 Greenwich Village Follies of 1923 (1981)
 Cactus Flower (1983)
 Charlie Girl (1986)
 Grand Hotel (Dec 31, 1991 to Apr 25, 1992)

Music videos
 "I Want to Be Your Property" by Blue Mercedes (1987)
 "Alright" by Janet Jackson (1990)

See also

References

External links

 
 
 
 Photographs and bibliography
 BBC obituary
 CBC obituary
 NY Times obituary
 

1922 births
2008 deaths
20th-century American actresses
Actresses from Texas
American female dancers
Dancers from Texas
American film actresses
American musical theatre actresses
American stage actresses
American television actresses
American Methodists
Ballets Russes dancers
Burials at Hillside Memorial Park Cemetery
Metro-Goldwyn-Mayer contract players
People from Amarillo, Texas
People with polio
United States National Medal of Arts recipients
Texas Republicans
Ballet Russe de Monte Carlo dancers
20th-century American singers
20th-century American women singers
20th-century American dancers
California Republicans